Laligurans Batika Secondary School (LBSS previously LGBS) is a co-educational institution. It was established in 1979 A.D. It is located at Bidhyanagar, Narephant, Koteshwor, Kathmandu, Nepal. Laligurans Batika Secondary School provided classes from 1 to 10 until the academic session of 2017/18 where the institute started serving students up to grade 12.

See also
 List of schools in Nepal

References
 http://www.lgbs.edu.np

Schools in Kathmandu
1979 establishments in Nepal